The 1911 Georgia Tech Yellow Jackets football team represented the Georgia Institute of Technology during the 1911 college football season. The team featured future coach William Alexander as a reserve quarterback.

Schedule

References

Georgia Tech
Georgia Tech Yellow Jackets football seasons
Georgia Tech Yellow Jackets football